Holly Gibney is a fictional character created by American author Stephen King. Originally appearing in the Bill Hodges trilogy of novels (Mr. Mercedes, Finders Keepers and End of Watch), she later appears as a major supporting character in The Outsider and as the main character in "If It Bleeds", a novella included in the collection of the same name. She has been portrayed on screen by Justine Lupe in the television adaptation of the Hodges trilogy and by Cynthia Erivo in the miniseries adaptation of The Outsider.

Character biography 
King has characterized Gibney as "an obsessive compulsive with a huge inferiority complex". She has been described as "very observant, refreshingly unfiltered and unaware of her innocence" with "savant-like memory, razor sharp observation skills", as well as "a computer whiz". She first appeared in Mr. Mercedes, where she is first shown as a shy (but brave and ethical) recluse with many emotional issues and social awkwardness. By the end of Mr. Mercedes her intelligence and courage play a major role in assisting main protagonist, Bill Hodges, to bring down the villain.  In Finders Keepers she has evolved into a private detective in partnership with Hodges. In Holly, Gibney returns as a solo private detective.

Characterization in The Outsider miniseries 
Richard Price, the developer and showrunner of the miniseries adaptation of The Outsider reworked the character to some extent, without keeping the continuity with the Mr. Mercedes TV series or Bill Hodges novels (Price did not watch the series or read the novels), and asked Stephen King to rename the character, but King insisted on keeping the name Holly Gibney.

Reception 
King has gone on record as loving the character, saying in a 2020 NPR interview: "I just love Holly, and I wish she were a real person. [...] She just walked on in the first book she was in, Mr. Mercedes, and she more or less stole the book, and she stole my heart."

References

External links 

Stephen King characters
Fictional characters introduced in 2014